The DeRemer Nunataks are a group of nunataks centered about 4 nautical miles (7 km) southeast of Mount Blowaway in the Wilson Hills. The group was mapped by the United States Geological Survey from surveys and U.S. Navy aerial photographs, 1960–63, and was named by the Advisory Committee on Antarctic Names for Yoeman First Class Dennis L. DeRemer, U.S. Navy, who served with the U.S. Naval Support Force, Antarctica, February 1967 to July 1970.

References

Nunataks of Oates Land